Agrafena Timopheyevna Saburova (née Okuneva, О′кунева; 1795, Saint Petersburg, Imperial Russia, — 2 February 1867, Saint Petersburg, Imperial Russia) was a prominent Russian stage actress. Originally an opera singer (who lost her singing voice in 1831), she excelled in plays by Alexander Griboyedov, Nikolay Polevoy and Alexander Ostrovsky, first in Moscow's Maly Theatre, then during her short stint at the Saint Petersburg's Alexandrinsky Theatre which she retired from in 1861. Actor Alexander Saburov (1800–1831) was her husband, actress and opera singer Ekaterina Saburova (1829–1905) their daughter.

References 

Russian stage actresses
Actresses from Saint Petersburg
1795 births
1867 deaths